James Argyle Smith (July 1, 1831 – December 6, 1901) was a United States Army officer, and a graduate of West Point. He is known for being a Confederate brigadier general during the Civil War, his works in the educational system in Mississippi, and in the Bureau of Indian Affairs.

Early life and career
James Smith was born on 1 July 1831 in Maury County, Tennessee. He went to West Point, graduated in 1853, and became a second lieutenant in the infantry. Smith served in various posts in the west including the Jefferson Barracks Military Post. Smith fought at the Battle of Ash Hollow against the Sioux in 1855. Then from 1857 to 1858, Smith fought in the Utah War against the Mormons. One year after returning from the Utah War Smith was promoted to a first lieutenant. In May 1861 Smith resigned his commission to join the Confederate Army.

Civil War service
Smith joined the Confederate Army in 1861 with the rank of lieutenant. In March 1862 he became a major and the adjutant-general to General Leonidas Polk. At the Battle of Shiloh Smith became the lieutenant-colonel of the Second Tennessee Infantry Regiment. General Bushrod Johnson commended Smith on his bravery at the Battle of Perryville and he was put in command of the 5th Confederate Infantry. His bravery was also noticed at the Battle of Murfreesboro by both General Cleburne and General Leonidas Polk. After his performance at the Battle of Chickamauga and the praise he received from Polk, Smith was promoted to brigadier general. At the Battle of Missionary Ridge General Smith attacked Sherman's flank preventing the Union Army of blocking off General Bragg's retreat. During the Battle of Missionary Ridge Smith was shot through both thighs while leading his men. After recovering Smith fought at the Battle of Atlanta where his brigade captured fifteen artillery pieces. During this battle he was wounded again. He was under the command of Cleburne at the Second Battle of Franklin, and after Cleburne's death Smith took over command at Nashville. General Smith and General William Bate led Cheatham's corps at the Battle of Bentonville.

Postbellum career and death
After starting a farm in Mississippi Smith was elected the Mississippi State Superintendent of Public Education from 1878 to 1886. He then became an agent of the Bureau of Indian Affairs from 1893 to 1897. He later become the Marshal of the Supreme Court of Mississippi. James Argyle Smith died on December 6, 1901, in Jackson, Mississippi and was buried at the Greenwood Cemetery there.

See also

List of American Civil War generals (Confederate)

Notes

References
 Eicher, John H., and David J. Eicher, Civil War High Commands. Stanford: Stanford University Press, 2001. .
 Herringshaw, Thomas William. Herringshaw's National Library of American Biography: Contains Thirty-five Thousand Biographies of the Acknowledged Leaders of Life and Thought of the United States; Illustrated with Three Thousand Vignette Portraits Chicago: American Publishers Association, 1914. pg. 249
 Heitman, Francis Bernard. Historical Register of the United States Army: From Its Organization, September 29, 1789, to September 29, 1889 Washington, DC: The National Tribune, 1890. pg. 599
 Evans, Clement A., ed. Confederate Military History: A Library of Confederate States History. 12 vols. Atlanta: Confederate Publishing Company, 1899. . Retrieved January 20, 2011. Volume: 7. Wheeler, Joseph; Alabama. Hooker, C. E.; Mississippi.
 Sifakis, Stewart. Who Was Who in the Civil War. New York: Facts On File, 1988. .
 Jack D. Welsh's Medical Histories of Confederate Generals (1999) pg. 200
 Warner, Ezra J. Generals in Gray: Lives of the Confederate Commanders. Baton Rouge: Louisiana State University Press, 1959. .) pgs. 281–82

1831 births
1901 deaths
Confederate States Army brigadier generals
United States Military Academy alumni
United States Army officers
People of Tennessee in the American Civil War
People from Maury County, Tennessee